A by-election was held for the New South Wales Legislative Assembly electorate of Corowa on 9 November 1946 because of the resignation of Christopher Lethbridge, to contest the federal seat of Riverina at the 1946 election as a Liberal candidate, however he was unsuccessful. Lethbridge then nominated as a  candidate to regain the seat.

The by-elections for Albury, Auburn and Ashfield were held on the same day.

Dates

Result

				

The by-election was caused by the resignation of Christopher Lethbridge.

See also
Electoral results for the district of Corowa
List of New South Wales state by-elections

References

1946 elections in Australia
New South Wales state by-elections
1940s in New South Wales
November 1946 events in Australia